Trygve Moe (21 March 1920 – 13 September 1998) was a Norwegian politician for the Liberal Party and the Liberal People's Party.

He served as a deputy representative to the Parliament of Norway from Vestfold during the term 1965–1969. In 1973 she stood for election for the Liberal People's Party.

He was a banker in Sandefjord.

References

1920 births
1998 deaths
Liberal Party (Norway) politicians
Liberal People's Party (Norway, 1972) politicians
20th-century Norwegian politicians
Vestfold politicians
Deputy members of the Storting
People from Sandefjord